{{Infobox album
| name       = The Wanda Jackson Show: Live and Still Kickin'
| type       = live
| artist     = Wanda Jackson
| cover      = Wanda Jackson--Live and Still Kickin.jpg
| released   = 
| recorded   = 
| venue      = 
| genre      = {{hlist|Country<ref name="Allmusic">{{cite web |title=Live and Still Kickin: Wanda Jackson: Songs, reviews, credits |url=https://www.allmusic.com/album/live-and-still-kickin-mw0000021115 |website=AllMusic |access-date=10 September 2021}}</ref>|Rockabilly}}
| label      = DCN
| producer   = 
| prev_title = The Queen of Rock' a 'Billy
| prev_year  = 1997
| next_title = Heart Trouble
| next_year  = 2003
}}The Wanda Jackson Show: Live and Still Kickin' is a live album by American recording artist Wanda Jackson. It was released on March 25, 2003 via the Digital Club Network and contained a total of 27 tracks. The album was recorded in New York City nearly a year prior and marked Jackson's first American live record in over two decades. It was also the third live album of her career. The disc received positive reviews from critics following its release. 

Background and content
Wanda Jackson had not recorded a live album for the American market in over 20 years. She had previously released a live project with Capitol Records in 1969 that had been issued in North America. She then released a second live disc in 1989 for her European fan base. On December 7, 2002, she appeared at the Village Underground in New York City (and later at Arlene Grocery) where she ultimately recorded her third live project. The project was recorded when Jackson was sixty five years old. It was produced by Brad Navin and Usher Winslett. It also featured Jackson's touring band named The Party Timers. 

Live and Still Kickin consisted of 27 tracks, mixing Jackson's Country and Rockabilly material. This included live versions of her Rockabilly recordings, like "Hot Dog! That Made Him Mad", "Fujiyama Mama" and "Let's Have a Party". On the album, Jackson also included covers of Hank Williams' "Lovesick Blues" and Bob Seger's "Old Time Rock and Roll".

Release and reception

''Live and Still Kickin was released on March 25, 2003 on the Digital Club Network, a New York label formally titled DCN. It was issued as a compact disc and marked Jackson's third live recording in her career. It was also her 71st album in total. The album was received positively by music critics and journalists. Andrew Gilstrap of PopMatters praised Jackson's vocal performance and was surprised to find her to have youthful energy: "Not only is she alive, but she’s in her mid-60s with a surprising amount of her presence and vocal range intact — especially her trademark growl." Ken Burke of Country Standard Time commented that "the 65-year-old Oklahoma legend transforms her live nightclub set into an entertaining mini-history lesson." 

Rock critic Robert Christgau explained that the album "offers proof aplenty that she [Jackson] remains likable, lively, and spunky." Although no formal review was given by AllMusic, the music website rated the album three stars out of five.

Track listing
{{Track listing
| headline      = The Wanda Jackson Show: Live and Still Kickin
| total_length  = 1:05:23
| title1        = Rock-A-Billy Fever
| writer1       = Carl Perkins
| length1       = 4:20
| title2        = Old Time Rock & Roll
| writer2       = 
| length2       = 2:49
| title3        = Rock 'N' Roll Journey
| length3       = 1:57
| title4        = Mean, Mean Man
| writer4       = Wanda Jackson
| length4       = 2:20
| title5        = I'm a Singer
| length5       = 1:56
| title6        = I Gotta Know
| writer6       = Thelma Blackmon
| length6       = 2:32
| title7        = Guitar in All the Right Places
| length7       = 1:53
| title8        = Blue Yodel #6
| writer8       = Jimmie Rodgers
| length8       = 3:04
| title9        = My Mentor 
| length9       = 1:06
| title10       = Wild Side of Life/Honky Tonk Angels
| writer10      = 
| length10      = 3:03
| title11       = When I Was a Young Girl
| length11      = 0:54
| title12       = Lovesick Blues
| writer12      = 
| length12      = 2:28
| title13       = #1 in Japan
| length13      = 2:37
| title14       = Fujiyama Mama
| writer14      = Earl Borrows
| length14      = 2:31
| title15       = For All the Girls
| length15      = 0:42
| title16       = Hot Dog! That Made Him Mad
| writer16      = 
| length16      = 3:08
| title17       = Toot Your Own Horn
| length17      = 2:12
| title18       = Right or Wrong
| writer18      = Jackson
| length18      = 2:37
| title19       = The One Joint I Missed
| length19      = 0:46
| title20       = Riot in Cell Block Number 9
| writer20      = Jerry Leiber and Mike Stoller
| length20      = 2:31
| title21       = This Guy Was Different
| length21      = 3:09
| title22       = One Night with You
| writer22      = 
| length22      = 2:22
| title23       = The Very Best Thing
| length23      = 1:04
| title24       = I Saw the Light
| writer24      = Williams
| length24      = 2:26
| title25       = Grab a D Chord and Hold On
| length25      = 2:27
| title26       = Let's Have a Party
| writer26      = Jessie Mae Robinson
| length26      = 2:53
| title27       = Whole Lotta Shakin'/Rip It Up
| writer27      = 
| length27      = 5:16
}}

Personnel
All credits are adapted from the liner notes of Live and Still Kickin and AllMusic.Musical personnel Jim Duffy – Piano
 Wanda Jackson – Lead vocals
 Mark Spencer – Lap steel guitar, lead guitar
 Robert B. Warren – Band leader
 Doug Wygal – DrumsTechnical personnel'''
 Ian Bryan – Arlene Grocery Sound Engineer
 Danny Garcia – Editing, mastering, mixing
 Holly George-Warren – Tray card text
 Bernardo Muricy – Village Underground sound engineer
 Jessica Nathanson – Project manager
 Brad Navin – Executive producer
 Dave Richman – Album artwork
 Steven Sandlick – Album photos
 John Steiner – Village Underground sound engineer
 Usher Winslett – Executive producer

Release history

References

2003 live albums
Wanda Jackson live albums